Sour Apples is a 2016 Turkish drama film directed by Yilmaz Erdogan.

Cast 
 Farah Zeynep Abdullah - Muazzez
 Yılmaz Erdoğan - Aziz Özay
 Songül Öden - Türkan Özay
 Şükran Ovalı - Safiye Özay

References

External links 

2016 drama films
Turkish drama films